DMDNB, or also DMNB, chemically 2,3-dimethyl-2,3-dinitrobutane, is a volatile organic compound used as a detection taggant for explosives, mostly in the United States where it is virtually the only such taggant in use. Dogs are very sensitive to it and can detect as little as 0.5 parts per billion in the air, as can specialised ion mobility spectrometers. Its presence allows more reliable explosive detection.

References

Explosive chemicals

Nitro compounds
Explosive detection